Final standings of the Hungarian League 1969 season

Final standings

Results

Statistical leaders

Top goalscorers

External links
 IFFHS link

Nemzeti Bajnokság I seasons
1968–69 in Hungarian football
1969–70 in Hungarian football
Hun
Hun